"Calling You" is a song from the film Bagdad Café, covered by Celine Dion.

Calling You may also refer to:
 Calling You (short story collection), a Japanese fictional short story collection by Otsuichi
Calling You (film), a Japanese film with Riko Narumi
 "Calling You" (Hank Williams song), 1946
 "Calling You" (Blue October song), 2003 
 "Calling You", a song by Aqua
 "Calling You", a song by Kat DeLuna
 "Calling You", a song by Richard Marx from Rush Street